There are many cocktails made with cachaça, the national spirit of Brazil. The caipirinha is by far the most popular and internationally well-known, but bartenders have developed other mixed drinks using the spirit.

Caipirinha

The Caipirinha is Brazil's national cocktail made with cachaça, ice, sugar, and lime.  It is the drink most commonly associated with cachaça.

In Brazil, other versions of caipirinha are made with different alcoholic beverages or fruits. A caipiroska or caipivodka is made with vodka instead of cachaça, while a caipiríssima is made with rum and a sakerinha, with sake. Different from the mojito, the caipiríssima is made with crushed lime (not lime juice), and has no mint or soda water. If other fruit is used instead of lime, it is usually called a batida or caipifruta.

Batida

Batida is a Brazilian cocktail made with the national alcoholic drink cachaça. In Portuguese, batida means shaken or milkshake.  It is made with cachaça, fruit juice (or coconut milk), and sugar. It can be blended or shaken with ice.

In Rio de Janeiro and São Paulo, batidas are traditionally served with feijoada.

A variation is made adding sweet condensed milk or sour cream.

The most common fruit used in a Batida are lemon, passion fruit and coconut.

Rabo-de-galo
Rabo-de-galo, which means "cock tail" (in Brazilian Portuguese cocktail is called coquetel), is a Brazilian drink made of cachaça and red vermouth. The history of the Rabo de Galo dates back to 1950s and the inauguration of the Cinzano factory in São Paulo, it is also known as Traçado, the Portuguese word for mixed. Alternatively, is known as a mixture of "everything you have in the bar" in some places.  It is questionable whether the proportions in rabo-de-galo have ever been formally established. Most bartenders will simply "eyeball" the two ingredients, adjusting the proportions to the customer's taste. A quite common version calls for 2/3 of cachaça and 1/3 of vermouth. Rabo-de-galo is usually served straight up in large shot glasses. A popular variation in São Paulo, Brazil substitutes the vermouth with Cynar, an Italian bitter apéritif liqueur flavored with artichoke.

Caju amigo (friendly cashew)

Caju amigo, also known as cajuzinho (little cashew), is a Brazilian drink made of cachaça and cashew juice. In some places, a slice of cashew is put in the drinker's mouth with a little bit of salt, chewed without swallowing, and a shot of cachaça is thrown back straight- swallowing the fruit and the drink at the same time.

Quentão (hot stuff)

Quentão, which means "very hot" or "big hot one", is a hot Brazilian drink made of cachaça and spices. It is often served during the celebrations known as Festas Juninas. The sugar is first caramelized with spices (whole cloves, cinnamon sticks and ginger chunks) and citrus peels (orange and lime). This mixture is then boiled with water for 10 minutes. The cachaça is added and boiled for another 5 minutes.

It is very common in southernmost parts of Brazil to use red wine instead of cachaça, the primary ingredient of Quentão, since this region is the largest wine producer in Brazil.

As the name suggests, it's meant to be served hot - ideally to be served outside on social gatherings on cold nights, near a fireplace. The ginger also adds to the sensation of warmth in the drink. The gingery flavor should be very distinctive, high notes of cloves must be present also. Nutmeg is an optional ingredient, used in some recipes.

Leite de onça (jaguar milk)

Leite de onça (Jaguar milk) is a cold Brazilian drink made of cachaça and condensed milk. It is very sweet and has a very suave scent that evokes the homely atmosphere of a Festa Junina. It is not easy to replace the ingredients and achieve a similar result because its taste is very peculiar.

It is usually served cold, in plain mugs, without garnish (though often cinnamon or chocolate powder is sprinkled over) so that it looks like milk at a first glance.

Macunaíma

The Macunaíma is a cocktail made with cachaça, sugar syrup, lime, and Fernet-Branca. It is shaken and served straight up in a "barriquinha", americano glass (a traditional Brazilian glass), or an old fashioned glass.
Created by Arnaldo Hirai from Boca de Ouro bar in 2014, it is named after the famous novel Macunaíma by Mário de Andrade.

Royce (shaken)

Royce is an American cocktail made with the Brazilian national spirit cachaça. This cocktail was named in honor of Royce Gracie, a great Brazilian jiu-jitsu fighter.

See also 
 List of Brazilian drinks
List of Brazilian dishes
Cachaça

References

External links

Brazilian cuisine
Lists of cocktails
Brazilian alcoholic drinks
Cocktails with cachaça